Wrs, or WRS, may refer to:

Arts and entertainment 
Wrs (singer), a Romanian singer
World Radio Switzerland, a Swiss English-language station

Businesses 
Western Rail Switching, a former railroad in the United States
Wind River Systems, a former embedded software company, now part of Intel

Military 
War reserve stock, material held for wartime
53d Weather Reconnaissance Squadron, also known as Hurricane Hunters

Other uses 
 Waris language, spoken on New Guinea (ISO 639-3: wrs)
Wolcott-Rallison syndrome, a rare medical disorder
Worker Registration Scheme, a registration scheme for foreign workers in the United Kingdom
World record size, in the Registry of World Record Size Shells
Wressle railway station, East Yorkshire, England (CRS code: WRS)

See also 
 WR (disambiguation)